Majid Khodaei (born 26 August 1978 in Mashhad) is an Iranian former wrestler.

Other Tournaments
He participated at the following other tournaments:

2001 World Wrestling Championships finished 14th at 84 kg Freestyle.
2003 World Wrestling Championships
2004 Summer Olympics finished 5th at 84 kg Freestyle.

References

1978 births
Wrestlers at the 2004 Summer Olympics
Living people
Sportspeople from Mashhad
Iranian male sport wrestlers
Olympic wrestlers of Iran
World Wrestling Championships medalists
Universiade medalists in wrestling
Universiade silver medalists for Iran
Medalists at the 2005 Summer Universiade
21st-century Iranian people